The , also known as the , was one of the most senior offices of the Fatimid Caliphate in the 12th century.

The post is first attested in the early years of the 12th century, during the vizierate of al-Afdal Shahanshah, when Husam al-Mulk Aftakin is mentioned as holding it. It effectively replaced the office of 'master of the curtain', which was usually held by a court eunuch of Slavic origin.

Most of the information about the duties of the office comes from the historian, and one-time Fatimid official, Ibn al-Tuwayr. When the vizier was a military commander, the  took up a role as the vizier's deputy and chief assistant. He also shared with the army's commander-in-chief ( or ) responsibility over military affairs.

As head chamberlain, the  also had a prominent role in public ceremonies and palace receptions. For ceremonial matters he had a deputy, to whom the important role of leading envoys to their assigned places.

Described as a "second vizierate", the office ranked second after the vizier in the official hierarchy, and served as a springboard for the vizierate itself for three of its holders: Abu'l-Fath Yanis, Ridwan ibn Walakhshi and Dirgham. The office is translated by modern scholars as "high chamberlain" or "majordomo".

References

Sources
 
 
 
 

Government of the Fatimid Caliphate
Titles in Egypt
Military history of the Fatimid Caliphate